Maren Ade (born 12 December 1976) is a German film director, screenwriter and producer. Ade lives in Berlin, teaching screenwriting at the Film Academy Baden-Württemberg in Ludwigsburg. Together with Janine Jackowski and Jonas Dornbach, she runs the production company Komplizen Film.

Early life and education
Ade was born in Karlsruhe, West Germany. As a teenager, she directed her first short films.

In 1998, she  began studying film production and media management, and later film direction at the University of Television and Film (HFF) in Munich, which she successfully completed in 2004.

Career
In 2001, Ade co-founded the film production company Komplizen Film together with Janine Jackowski, a fellow graduate from HFF. It was with Komplizen Film that she produced her final student film The Forest for the Trees at HFF in 2003. Among other honors, the film received the Special Jury Award at the Sundance Film Festival in 2005. The Forest for the Trees was screened at a large number of international festivals.

In 2009, her second film Everyone Else celebrated its world premiere in the Official Competition section of the Berlin International Film Festival, where it received the Silver Bear for Best Film (Jury Grand Prix) and the Best Actress Silver Bear for Birgit Minichmayr. Everyone Else was released in theatres in over 18 countries.

In 2012, Ade announced she would be writing and directing a film called Toni Erdmann about a man who begins to play pranks on his adult daughter after he finds she has become too serious. The film debuted In Competition at the 2016 Cannes Film Festival, the first German film to debut there in 10 years. The film won the top prize at the European Film Awards (Best European Film), thus making Ade the first woman to direct a movie that won the top prize at those awards.

Personal life
Ade lives with director  and their two children in Berlin.

Awards and nominations
 2005: Special Jury Award, Sundance Film Festival for The Forest for the Trees
 2005: Best Feature Film - Grand Prize, IndieLisboa - International Independent Film Festival for The Forest for the Trees 
 2005: Best Film, nomination for the German Film Award for The Forest for the Trees
 2005: Best Feature Film, Cine Jove Valencia Film Festival for The Forest for the Trees
 2005: Best Actress: Eva Löbau, Buenos Aires Independent Film Festival for The Forest for the Trees
 2009: Silver Bear – Jury Grand Prix, Berlinale, for Everyone Else
 2009: Silver Bear– Best Actress for Birgit Minichmayr, Berlinale, for Everyone Else
 2010: Nominated for Best Film, Best Direction and Best Female Lead for Birgit Minichmayr, German Film Award for Everyone Else 
 2010: Best Direction and FIPRESCI Critics' Award, Buenos Aires Festival of Independent Cinema for Everyone Else 
 2010: Main Prize, International Women's Film Festival Dortmund for Everyone Else
 2010: Best Actor for Lars Eidinger, Love Is Folly International Film Festival for Everyone Else 
 2010: Best Actress for Birgit Minichmayr, Ourense Film Festival for Everyone Else 
 2014: Berlin Art Prize in the category Film and Media Art
 2015: DEFA Foundation Award for Outstanding Performance in German Film for Komplizen Film
 2016: Academy Award nomination,  Best Foreign Film, for "Toni Erdmann"

Filmography
As director and screenwriter
 2000 Level 9, short film (script and direction)
 2001 Vegas, short film (script and direction) 
 2003 The Forest for the Trees, feature film (script and direction)
 2009 Everyone Else, feature film (script and direction)
 2016 Toni Erdmann, feature film (script and direction)

As producer
 2002 Karma Cowboy, feature film by Sonja Heiss and Vanessa van Houten, producer
 2006 , feature film by Sonja Heiss, producer
 2012 Tabu, feature film by Miguel Gomes, co-producer
 2012 The Dead and the Living, feature film by Barbara Albert, co-producer
 2013 Tanta Agua, feature film by Ana Guevara and Leticia Jorge, co-producer
 2013 Redemption, short film by Miguel Gomes, co-producer
 2014 Superegos, feature film by Benjamin Heisenberg, producer
 2014 Love Island, feature film by Jasmila Zbanic, co-producer
 2015 Hedi Schneider Is Stuck, feature film by Sonja Heiss, producer
 2015 Arabian Nights, feature film by Miguel Gomes, co-producer
 2017 Western, feature film by Valeska Grisebach, producer
 2020 The Story of My Wife, feature film by Ildikó Enyedi, producer
 2021 Spencer, feature film by Pablo Larraín, producer

References

Further reading
 Take 100, The Future of Film: 100 New Directors, Phaidon Verlag, 2010
 The Berlin School: Films from the Berliner Schule, The Museum of Modern Art, New York, 2013

External links
 
 50 Best FIlmmakers Under 50
 Was ich dir noch sagen wollte
  Perfectly Happy, Until They Venture Into the Outside World

1976 births
Living people
European Film Award for Best Director winners
European Film Award for Best Screenwriter winners
Film people from Berlin